Bologhine is a suburb of the city of Algiers in northern Algeria. It is named after Bologhine ibn Ziri, who founded the city in 944.

Notable people

References

External links 

Communes of Algiers Province
Algiers Province